is a platform arcade video game developed by AM Factory, with the assistance of Paon, and released by Eleven/Gavaking on January 27, 2000. The game never received an official release for either the Neo Geo AES (home) or Neo Geo CD platforms. It concerns the story of a grave keeper discovering graves being desecrated and his attempt to prevent the graverobbers from inflicting further damage.

Gameplay 

A grave keeper goes around graveyards protecting them from evil doers. The player clears the area and collects power-ups using them to eliminate the enemies. There are five stages with five levels each, and each one of them has you throwing fireballs at ghouls, ghosts, goblins, and zombies. Similar to Snow Bros., when you keep throwing fireballs at these enemies, they will ignite into a giant ball, which you can throw at other enemies to kill them, and get the remaining treasure before moving on to the next level. The difference between Snow Bros. and this game is that the former produces power-up items from fallen enemies rolled over by launched big ball, whereas this game produces power-up items directly from a giant ball launched by the player upon its destruction. Enemies that are killed by big balls in this game only gives gems that boosts player's score. But scoring means little, as this game's extra life system is not score-based. To obtain power-ups in this game player must turn as many enemies into giant balls, then launch them separately. Once launched, giant balls are eventually destroyed when they hit the edge of platforms, releasing a power-up item. Also unlike Snow Bros. not all items are beneficial: there is an item that is detrimental to the player by stripping away all powers he previously collected upon consumption. At the end of the fourth level, a boss must be defeated in order to continue the game. Upon defeat, all sorts of items are released en masse from the fallen boss' carcasses in every which way and if the player is masterful in his skill, he can anticipate the timing of items released and jump onto the position where items pour out, able to obtaining most, if not all items in one go. There is an item in a form of a large meat that only appear post-boss battles: a big meat grants the player an extra life so it is imperative that the player gets it. Meats may appear as multiple at random after boss battle.

Plot 
There lived one grave watcher (although this game is a 2-players co-op game, the story states one grave watcher) with magical power at a very small village in a remote region. He lived a quiet, solitary life in a corner of the cemetery. He kept away from the village people due to his very ugly appearance. One day, he found the graves were ransacked and some corpses were stolen. He didn't want the village people to find out, so he decided to eliminate the grave burglars by himself. Thus, he patrolled the cemetery every night.

He found out that a powerful Wizard has been stealing corpses to build his army of undead to terrorize the village. He then took himself to eliminate the Wizard once and for all.

After defeating the Wizard, he returns to his solitary life. Eventually, the villagers find out about his bravery in protecting them from the menace of the Wizard and go to his house and express their gratitude to him.

Reception 

In 2023 Time Extension identified Nightmare in the Dark as one of the best games for the Neo Geo.

Notes

References

External links 
 
 Nightmare in the Dark at GameFAQs
 Nightmare in the Dark at Killer List of Videogames
 Nightmare in the Dark at MobyGames

2000 video games
Arcade video games
Multiplayer and single-player video games
SNK games
Neo Geo games
Platform games
Arcade-only video games
Video games set in cemeteries
Video games developed in Japan